The Niagara Purple Eagles women's ice hockey team was a National Collegiate Athletic Association (NCAA) Division I college ice hockey program that represented Niagara University. The Purple Eagles were a member of College Hockey America. They played at the Dwyer Arena in Niagara University's campus (Lewiston, New York).

History
In 2002, Niagara appeared in the Frozen Four but lost in the semi-finals to Minnesota-Duluth by a score of 3-2. Niagara tied Minnesota 2-2 in the Consolation Game.  Tania Pinelli was included in the all-tournament team. 

In the 2002-03 season, the team changed athletic conference from ECAC to College Hockey America. 

On March 19, 2012, the school announced that it was cancelling its women's ice hockey program.

Year by year

Awards and honors
Jenni Bauer, CHA Defensive Player of the Week (November 16, 2009)
Jenni Bauer, CHA Defensive Player of the Week (November 30, 2009)
Jenni Bauer, CHA Defensive Player of the Week (February 1, 2010)
Jenni Bauer, First Team All-CHA
Amy Jack, CHA All Tournament Team (2003-2004)
Amy Jack, CHA Rookie of the Week (October 31,2002) 
Kathleen Bortuzzo, CHA Rookie of the Week (Week of February 22, 2010)
Daniela Del Colle, CHA Player of the Week (Week of February 15, 2010)
Valerie Hall, 2003 CHA Player of the Year
Valerie Hall, 2003 Student-Athlete of the Year honors
Valerie Hall led all CHA players in scoring (games played against CHA opponents only) with eight points on five goals and three assists.
Jenna Hendrikx,  CHA Rookie Of The Week Award (Oct 6, 2009)
Jenna Hendrikx,  CHA Rookie Of The Week Award (Oct 26, 2009)
Jenna Hendrikx, 2010 CHA All-Rookie Team

USCHO honors
Ashley Riggs, 2004-05 All USCHO.com Rookie Team

See also
Niagara Purple Eagles men's ice hockey

References

External links 

 
Ice hockey clubs disestablished in 2012
2012 disestablishments in New York (state)